Vivid Seats Inc. is an American ticket exchange and resale company. The company went public on October 19, 2021 after a merger earlier in that year with Horizon Acquisition Corporation, a SPAC. It trades on the NYSE and Nasdaq as SEAT.

In 2017, it was reported to have a turnover of $1 billion and to be the third-largest online ticket reseller.

History

Vivid Seats was founded in Chicago, Illinois, in 2001 by Jerry Bednyak and Eric Vassilatos.

Vivid Seats has been invested in by two private equity companies, Vista Equity Partners in 2016 and GTCR in 2017. GTCR bought a majority stake for $575 million.

Vivid Seats is a member of the Internet Association, which advocates for net neutrality.

The company went public on October 19, 2021 after a merger earlier in 2021 with Horizon Acquisition Corporation, a SPAC. It trades on the NYSE and Nasdaq as SEAT. Todd Boehly is chairman of Horizon Acquisitions Corporation, which announced that “Eldridge Industries, LLC (“Eldridge”), an affiliate of Horizon’s sponsor, Horizon Sponsor, LLC, has entered into an agreement with DraftKings (NASDAQ: DKNG) to make a private placement PIPE investment in connection with the closing of the previously announced merger between Horizon and Vivid Seats.”

Operations

Vivid Seats is a middleman between ticket buyers and sellers, taking a 10% commission once tickets have sold and additionally charging buyers service fees (circa 20 to 40%) and shipping charges.

Partnerships

In February 2017, ESPN made Vivid Seats its official ticket provider, replacing StubHub.

In April 2017, Time Inc. made Vivid Seats the official ticket provider for Sports Illustrated.

Also in 2017, Vivid Seats entered into partnerships with the University of Tennessee, the University of Rhode Island, and the Preakness Stakes. It has existing partnerships with entities such as the University of Notre Dame and Duke University.

In August 2018, Vivid Seats was named the official ticketing partner of the Los Angeles Clippers of the NBA.

Expansion

In 2014, Vivid Seats moved its corporate headquarters to Chicago's West Loop while also retaining office space for its operations team nearby to accommodate new employees, 100 having been hired in the last year.

In April 2019, Vivid Seats acquired Toronto-based software company Fanxchange.

References

External links
 

2001 establishments in Illinois
Companies based in Chicago
Companies listed on the Nasdaq
Ticket sales companies